Nickel(II) phosphate is an inorganic compound with the formula Ni3(PO4)2.  It is a mint green paramagnetic solid that is insoluble in water.

Hydrated nickel(II) phosphate
The hydrate Ni3(PO4)2·8(H2O) is a light green solid, which can be prepared by hydrothermal synthesis and also occurs as the mineral arupite. It features octahedral Ni centers, which are bound to water and phosphate.

References

Phosphates
Nickel compounds